Azizul Haq Mollah is a Bangladesh Nationalist Party politician and the former Member of Parliament of Bogra-4.

Career
Mollah was elected to parliament from Bogra-4 as a Bangladesh Nationalist Party candidate in 1991.

References

Bangladesh Nationalist Party politicians
1993 deaths
5th Jatiya Sangsad members